Charles Wang is a Chinese physician and lawyer. He is a leading figure in the merging of traditional Chinese and Western medicine in medical therapy.

Wang studied Western medicine at the Shanghai Second Medical University, graduating in 1986. Afterwards he entered the Shanghai University of Traditional Chinese Medicine, where he earned a master's degree in TCM in 1988. Having finished his studies, Wang's first few years as a medical practitioner were spent serving as a resident, and then as an endocrinologist and a specialist of Chinese medicine at Shanghai's renowned Ruijin Hospital.

In 1995, Wang briefly left the medical field to study at the University of New Hampshire School of Law, where he earned an LL.M.

Much of Wang's most important work is with foreign clientele and organizations, particularly those in Europe, where his expertise in medicine and law is highly regarded. As a lawyer, Wang served as co-chairman of the Asia-Europe "Workshop of Copyright Trading for Book Publishers" in 2000, and in 2002, he was tasked with carrying out enforcement programs at the provincial level in China as part of an EU-China project on intellectual property protection. He has also been recognized by the Pudong district government in Shanghai for his legal work representing foreign-owned firms such as the Coca-Cola Pacific Group. One of the highlights of Wang's legal career was serving as the general counsel for Beijing Olympic Broadcasting, a joint venture owned by the International Olympic Committee and which produced the main international feeds for the 2008 Summer Olympics and the 2008 Summer Paralympics.

As a medical expert, Wang served as a panelist for the Asia-Europe Foundation's programs for pandemic preparedness in 2012, and since 2013 he has served as the primary physician for the China operations of Lufthansa, the German airline. He has also been a guest professor at the Shanghai University of Traditional Chinese Medicine.

In 2000, Wang was named a "Personnalité d’Avenir" (Personality of the Future) by the French Foreign Ministry, and in 2015 he was featured in a CCTV International French special entitled "China-France: 50 Witnesses in 50 Years" — a program celebrating the 50th anniversary of China-France diplomatic relationship and which was jointly produced by the foreign ministries of both countries. The program also aired on France's TV5Monde.

In 2012, Wang opened the WZW Medical Clinic, which has since become one of the top TCM clinics in Shanghai. A major driving factor in the clinic's success is Wang's unique herbal medicine products, which he calls "Dr. Wang's Formulae".

See also 
List of Chinese physicians

References

Traditional Chinese medicine practitioners
Year of birth missing (living people)
Living people
Chinese endocrinologists
20th-century Chinese physicians
21st-century Chinese physicians